Virtual engagement is a metric to determine the level of affinity between a company and its customers. In today's internet economy, few things matter as much to marketers as the customer's sentiment towards the brand or the product of a given corporation. Marketing professionals are engaging prospects and moving them along the customer engagement cycle to convert them into customers and finally brand advocates.

Online environments play a critical role for customer lifecycle management, where virtual events have an important part in the marketing mix. Here, all customer activities take place in a controlled environment, allowing detailed feedback about the level of engagement. The customer engagement index can be used to measure how successful a company is in connecting with its community. It is a metric, derived from an aggregation of behavioral and demographic variables and used for assessing lead quality during events in virtual environments.

Industry analysts have established community engagement as a concept, as it has become clear that companies need to focus on a more granular level on the behavior of individual customers or prospects to determine the strength of the connection they have been able to establish.

Virtual marketing communication 

The world of marketing and how to most effectively communicate to customers is forever changing. Virtual marketing is the latest change and arguably one of the most exciting. The virtual world gives companies the opportunity to either excel in their market place or fall behind continuously evolving times. 
Facebook, alone, has 2.85 billion monthly active users (Protalinski, 2014), which creates a virtual platform where marketers can connect and communicate with customers in a way never possible before. They can identify their preferences, tailor and target their advertising and create online conversations and communications. According to Claffey and Brady (2014) word of mouth, or consumer to consumer (C2C) advertising, is very effective and beneficial to consumers as it creates a virtual space where they can communicate with each other. They can inform each other about personal experiences with the company, be it positive and/or negative. The effectiveness of this is seen with Trip Advisor which is increasingly becoming the first port of call for travel information and impacting tourism operators business both positively and negatively depending on consumer reviews.

It is not only beneficial for consumers, this virtual platform can be taken advantage of by businesses. They can easily create online consumer communities and build brand loyalty. How businesses communicate in the virtual world is increasingly important as it reflects on their brand. Answering questions and dealing with complaints quickly is vital and an easy way to start an organisation virtual marketing. As these virtual platforms are very public it makes how businesses deal with consumers a very delicate matter, as a bad impression will not only affect the primary consumer but also everyone who happens to view it. One bad review/comment can have a significant impact on the organisations future revenue.

Consumers tend to be more relaxed whilst browsing the virtual marketplace as they are in the comfort and security of their own home. They tend not to be less aware of the variety of marketing techniques used as they are when they are in the physical market place. Marketers target this, as decisions are made more freely and willingly. The rise of "Treat Me" advertising is an excellent example of traditional advertising (letter box mailers) being put into a virtual context (emailed to people) and being more effective as people are more relaxed while on line and prepared to make spontaneous purchases. The virtual format allows the person to make an instant purchase, rather than having to drive to the physical shop. Due to there being no physical payment it is easier for the consumer to not realise the money they just spent. Online shopping an easy past time full of bargains and sales.

The virtual market place relies on photos of products, which means the colours and how the products looks may vary from the physical product. These photos are altered with the use of Photoshop to make them more appealing to the consumer. This is a drawback as, for many, consumers still need to feel and touch or try on the product, before making their purchasing decision. Businesses are often having to straddle both the physical and virtual marketplace. Although the virtual is increasingly becoming the main marketing platform with the physical supporting the virtual. Whereas a decade ago it was the reverse.

The marketing strategies of old are no longer as suitable for modern society, with the digital age taking over, it is reforming the way marketers target consumers. Where traditionally marketing focused on the product, now it is more important for the business to focus on the consumer and the brand itself. Businesses cannot expect to be able to communicate as they have been, where they just post pictures and descriptions of their product. They must redesign their marketing structure to suit the needs of the digital consumer (Savulescu, 2011). The question is raised by Savulescu (2011) whether businesses should be able to advertise on social media, which is a place designed to contact peers and use as a form of leisure. For consumers business advertising in these forums could be seen as intrusive, and invasion of privacy or even unethical. This could affect the business's brand. However consumers generally accept that social media sites are businesses which need funding to provide their platforms. So they accept that advertising is the way the platforms are funded and therefore accept it, as necessary. However this does not mean the consumers may not feel negatively too excessive and annoying advertising, which could in turn reduce reciprocity to the message or damage their connection with the brand. Savulescu's question, however, is a reminder to businesses that they should respect the forums as a place of peer to peer conversations and social leisure and ensure their presence in these forums is not over bearing or intrusive.

The use of social media  

A business can use this virtual platform as a place to advertise to customers, in particular social media, such as Facebook, is used by advertisers to target consumers. Social media helps to categorise consumers by having groups that they can join, which identifies their interests. Businesses have now got a self-selected market segmentation they can now target their advertising to. 
Businesses can also use virtual engagement as a way to contact consumers and get feedback, market insights and engagement, as well as give the consumer information they may require before they make the purchase. This virtual engagement allows the consumer to create a sense of ‘relationship’ with the business as they are able to interact and communicate easily with them, which leads to trust and brand loyalty being formed. 
Another strategy a businesses are using through the virtual world is running competitions over social media and taking advantage of its accessibility. Often these competitions are used to gain more followers using: “like and share this post”. Businesses are becoming ever increasingly creative with the “like and share this post” competition to maximise the effectiveness and benefits. For example, when National Geographic ran their competition, my Nat Geo cover shot, over Facebook they asked fans to upload their own photos that they had taken, add a caption and be in to win. This campaign not only gave the consumer a feeling that they are a National Geographic photographer, but also gave National Geographic a large amount of information about their customers and their traveling behaviours, photo techniques and much more (Naidu, 2014).

The use of social media has been a revolutionary marketing strategy for many industries. Tourism for instance, once dominated by travel agents and travel brochures is now dominated by online forums and booking sites. Tourism companies now have an easy platform where they can post photos to inspire and attract consumers. Give consumers information on places to go and where to stay, and even once the travel is over successful marketing strategies can be used to help the consumer remember their time there (Popesku, 2014). Businesses can either choose to have paid advertisements or unpaid advertisements on social media. Unpaid, are groups and competitions run by the company. Paid is where the business pays the social media site to have their advertisement show up on the users screen without the user giving permission. These are usually either on the side of the screen or can be “sponsored” depending on what the business pays. According to Xie, and Lee (2015) paid and unpaid advertisements have equal effect on consumers’ willingness to purchase the certain brand. As an example of how tourism companies are using social media NZ Rental Cars follows travels Instagram posts and re-blogs them onto their site to showcase NZ places to visit and attract customers.

A more recent change in the tourism industry is the rise of “Air B and B” (Air BnB, n.d.), where people can advertise their own homes for accommodation. This is challenging the traditional accommodation market.

Another example is Uber, who have taken advantage of the virtual world and solely rely on its accessibility. Uber is a private taxi service that you just open the app and the cab comes to you, there is no phone called required and the fee is taken directly from your bank account so no payment issues occur. 
What we are seeing is rapid change in industries brought about by the virtual marketplace and communication. This requires traditional businesses in industries to adapt to their marketing strategies quickly or risk being replaced.

Role in Organizations  

Virtual engagement is still new to businesses, although they can see the opportunity it is hard to determine the return on investment of advertising in the virtual world. Kumar, Bezawada, Rishika, Janakiraman, & Kannan (2016) conducted a study to determine the effects of social media advertising on consumers, the results showed that social media advertising is effective, although it is more effective when cross-channel advertising is used. Cross-channel advertising is when a business advertises in different channels, for example, on social media and magazines. Kumar et al. (2016) recommends that managers choose to embrace social network as a means to further interact with the customer and help build a stronger relationship. This will lead to an increase in brand loyalty and increased customer spending. Xie, and Lee (2015) recommends managers invest in social media advertisement, although be hesitant of the amount as it is still not completely clear of the direct results. It is noted that social media advertisement is more likely to enhance brand image and create brand loyalty, than sales on a particular product? This is because the consumer may not need or want the product being advertised, but they are still seeing the brand and becoming familiar with it.

Security  

With the business world increasingly operating on virtual platforms the fear of hackers is rising. As more jobs are using this virtual platform as a standard procedure, the amount of information that is available to be hacked is also increasing. This information may be confidential and if found by the wrong people, detrimental to the business and its customers. One well publicised case was the hacking of the online cheating site Ashley Madison. Consumers joined this site to arrange affairs (cheat on their partners) with others on the site. This information was then leaked enabling the “cheaters” partners to see what they have been up to. This was obviously disastrous for the online business and its customers. 
Consumers are also vulnerable to hackers as a business would benefit greatly from information that a hacker could obtain such as personal opinions, or even where they spend their free time (Newe, 2015). In addition if the hackers can get the consumers credit card details the consumer could lose money. This creates a demand for ever increasing sophistication in security services and programmes.

Consumers are having to become more ‘savvy’ as the virtual platforms provide ever increasing opportunity for ‘scamming’ marketing. Some of these scams can be in the form of online auction scams, dating and romance scams, holiday scams, or even mail order. Consumers are having to check the authenticity of offers and sites before making purchases. (Consumer, 2015)

Thus it is on the business to protect its customers and convince them of their authenticity.

See also
Enterprise engagement

References

Marketing techniques
Digital marketing